The 2016–17 season was Fenerbahçe's 103rd season in the existence of the club. The team played in the TBL and in the Euroleague.

Season overview

Players

Squad information

Players In

|}
Total spending:  €0

Players Out

Total income:  €0

Total expenditure:  €0

Technical Staff

General Manager  Maurizio Gherardini
Team Manager  Cenk Renda
Head coach  Željko Obradović
Assistant coach  Josep Maria Izquierdo
Assistant coach  Vladimir Androić
Assistant coach  Erdem Can
Assistant coach  Berkay Oğuz
Conditioning coach  Predrag Zimonjić
Conditioning coach  İlker Belgutay
Physiotherapist  Sefa Öztürk

Kit

Supplier: Nike
Main sponsor: metro

Back sponsor: QNB Finansbank
Short sponsor:

Statistics

Pre-season and friendlies

Fenerbahçe finished the tournament as champions

Fenerbahçe finished the tournament as runners-up

Competitions

Overall

Overview

Turkish Basketball President's Cup

Turkish Basketball Super League

League table

Regular season

Playoffs

Turkish Basketball Cup

EuroLeague

Regular season

Playoffs

In the playoffs, teams play against each other which must win three games to win the series. Thus, if one team win three games before all five games have been played, the games that remain are omitted. The team that finished in the higher 

Game 1 was played on 18 April, while Game 2 was played on 20 April and Game 3 also played on 25 April 2016.

Final Four

The Final Four is the last phase of the season, and is held over a weekend. The semifinal games play on Friday evening. Sunday starts with the third-place game, followed by the championship game. The Final Four was played at the Sinan Erdem Dome in Istanbul, Turkey on 19 and 21 May 2017.

Bracket

Semifinal

Championship game
Fenerbahçe played in its second consecutive championship game, after it lost to CSKA Moscow in 2016. Olympiacos returned to the title game for the first time since 2015.

The first two quarters were evenly matched. Fenerbahçe  opened the scoring and lead by 5–1 before Olympiacos replied with five unanswered points. They relinquished the lead soon after and were unable to regain it for the remainder of the game. Fenerbahçe took an eight-point lead over Olympiacos after the first quarter, with a score of 26–18, though Olympiacos had reduced the deficit to five points, to 39–34, by half time. Fenerbahçe broke away in the third quarter, taking a commanding twelve point lead to go into the fourth quarter 60–48 up. An 11–2 run by Fenerbahçe at the start of the final quarter effectively secured the title for the club. The game ended with a score of 80–64. Fenerbahçe led at each quarter on its way to the title, and head coach Željko Obradović added to his record total of nine EuroLeague championships. Fenerbahçe became the Turkish first club to win the EuroLeague championship.

Bogdan Bogdanović and Nikola Kalinić both scored the most points, with 17 each, while Ekpe Udoh set a EuroLeague championship game record of five blocks. Udoh was also named EuroLeague Final Four MVP.

Individual awards
EuroLeague MVP of the Round
 Ekpe Udoh – Regular Season, Round 4
 Jan Veselý - Regular Season, Round 20
 Bogdan Bogdanović - Playoffs, Game 1
 Bogdan Bogdanović - Playoffs, Game 2

EuroLeague MVP of the Month
 Bogdan Bogdanović, April

EuroLeague Final Four MVP
 Ekpe Udoh

References

External links

2016-17
2016–17 in Turkish basketball by club
2016–17 EuroLeague by club